Bharat Electronics Limited (BEL) is an Indian Government-owned aerospace and defence electronics company. It primarily manufactures advanced electronic products for ground and aerospace applications. BEL is one of nine PSUs under the Ministry of Defence of India. It has been granted Navratna status by the Government of India. 

On 24 January 2023, the world's largest institutional investor the Norwegian Government Pension Fund Global divested from BEL due to “unacceptable risk that the companies are selling weapons to a state that uses these weapons in ways that constitute serious and systematic breaches of the international rules on the conduct of hostilities”. The background for the decision is sales of military material to the military in Myanmar which has committed genocide against the Rohingya people.

History of BEL
Bharat Electronics Limited was founded in Bangalore, Karnataka, India in 1954.

Starting with the manufacture of a few communication equipment in 1956, BEL started manufacturing receiving valves in 1961, germanium semiconductors in 1962, and radio transmitters for AIR in 1964 with help from the Soviet Union.
 In 1966, BEL set up a radar manufacturing facility for the army and in-house R&D. In 1967, BEL began manufacturing transmitting tubes, silicon devices and integrated circuits. The PCB manufacturing facility was established in 1968.
 In 1970, BEL started making black & white TV picture tubes, X-ray tubes and microwave tubes. In 1971, BEL set up facilities for the manufacture of integrated circuits and hybrid micro circuits. 1972, BEL established manufacturing facilities for TV transmitters for Doordarshan. In 1973, BEL began manufacturing frigate radars for the navy.

Under the government's policy of decentralisation and due to strategic reasons, BEL set up new units at different location across the country. The second unit of BEL was set up at Ghaziabad in 1974 to manufacture radars and Tropo communication equipment for the Indian Air Force. The third unit was established at Pune in 1979 to manufacture image converter and image intensifier tubes.
 In 1980, the first overseas office of BEL was set up in New York for the procurement of components and materials.
 In 1981, a manufacturing facility for magnesium manganese dioxide batteries was set up at Pune. The Space Electronic Division was set up at Bangalore to support the satellite programmes in 1982. That year, BEL achieved a turnover of 1 billion (US$21 million).
 In 1983, the Andhra Scientific Company (ASCO) was taken over by BEL converted it to its fourth manufacturing unit at Machilipatnam. 
 In 1985, the fifth unit was set up in Chennai for supply of tank electronics, with proximity to Heavy Vehicles Factory, Chennai of the Ordnance Factory Board. The sixth unit was set up at Panchkula the same year to manufacture military communication equipment.
 In 1986, BEL set up three units. Its seventh unit was set up at Kotdwara to manufacture switching equipment, the eighth unit to manufacture TV glass shell at Taloja (Navi Mumbai) and the ninth unit at Hyderabad to manufacture electronic warfare equipment.
 In 1987, a separate Naval Equipment Division was set up at Bangalore to give greater focus to naval projects. The first Central Research Laboratory was established at Bangalore in 1988 to focus on futuristic research and development.
 In 1989, BEL started manufacturing telecom switching and transmission systems and also the set up the Mass Manufacturing Facility in Bangalore and the manufacture of the first batch of 75,000 electronic voting machines.

The agreement for setting up BEL's first joint venture company, BE DELFT, with M/s Delft of Holland, was signed in 1990. This later became a subsidiary of BEL with the exit of the foreign partner and has been renamed BEL Optronic Devices Limited.

The second Central Research Laboratory was established at Ghaziabad in 1992. The first disinvestment (20%) and listing of the company's shares in the Bangalore and Mumbai Stock Exchanges took place in same year-1992.
 In 1996, BEL achieved ₹10 billion (US$215 million) turnover.
 In 1997, GE BEL, the second joint venture company with M/s GE, USA, was formed as also the third JVC with M/s Multitone, UK, BEL Multitone. The same year, the US imposed supply restrictions on BEL.
 In 1998, BEL set up its second overseas office at Singapore to source components from South East Asia. In the same year US and Europe imposed sanctions on BEL. The company was able to overcome the effects of the sanctions and kept up the promised deliveries to customers.
 In 2000, BEL reorganised its Bangalore unit into six Strategic Business Units (SBUs). The R&D groups in Bangalore were also restructured into Specific Core Groups and Product Development Groups. The same year, BEL shares were listed in the National Stock Exchange.
 In 2002, BEL became the first defence PSU to achieve operational Mini Ratna Category I status. In 2003, the company's turnover crossed the ₹25 billion mark (US$540 million). In 2005, BEL had a turnover of ₹32.20 billion (US$695 million). BEL achieved a turnover of ₹35.60 billion (US$767 million) in 2005–06.
 On 12 May 2010, Boeing announced that it received the Data Link II communications technology for the Indian Navy's P-8I from Bharat Electronics Limited (BEL) in April, one month ahead of schedule. BEL delivered the Indian-designed communications system that would enable the exchange of tactical data and messages between Indian Navy aircraft, ships and shore establishments. Boeing installed the system during final assembly of P-8I.
 In 2011, the Indian government-owned Bharat Electronic Limited (BEL) showcased its entire range of C4ISR capabilities including network centric warfare technologies developed in-house at Aero India 2011. These include command and control system, air space management multi sensor tracking, situation simulator and tactical algorithm for air defence applications; battlefield management system and an all-weather 24/7 coastal surveillance system.

 In 2019, the Indian government-owned Bharat Electronic Limited (BEL) was awarded the tender to implement the project "Integrated Command and Control Centre" for Gangtok Smart City under Smart Cities Mission initiated by the Ministry of Housing & Urban Affairs, Government of India.

In addition, new products and technologies including software defined radios, next generation bulk encryptor and high data tactical radio were also on show. Airborne products displayed included radar finger printing system, data link, digital flight control computer and identification friend or foe. Also on display were the complete range of optoelectronic equipment, including night vision devices, digital handheld compass and an advanced land navigation system.

BEL is the lead integrator of Akash, the Indian-made guided missile air defence weapon system. Another major system is weapon locating radar, the state-of-the-art passive, phased array radar which has undergone successful user trials by the Indian defence forces.

Products

BEL designs, develops and manufactures a range of products in the following fields:
 Electronic voting machines
 Voter-verified paper audit trail
 Traffic signals
 Radars
 BEL Weapon Locating Radar
 BEL Battle Field Surveillance Radar
 Indian Doppler Radar
 Samyukta Electronic Warfare System
 Central acquisition radar (3D-CAR)
 Reporter Radar
 Telecommunications
 Sound and vision broadcasting
 Opto-electronics
 Information technology
 Semiconductors
 Missiles
 Akash (missile) in partnership with the Ordnance Factory Board
 Sonars
 Composite Communication System (CCS)
 Fire-control system
 Radar
 Electronic warfare systems
 F-INSAS in partnership with the Ordnance Factory Board
 Simulators
 Tank electronics
 Combined day sight for OFB Arjun MBT
 Defence communications
 Data Link II communications system for the Indian Navy's P-8I
 Combat management system for Indian Navy
 Solar power generation systems
 Naval systems
 C4I systems for Air force
 A low-cost tablet PC being used in the Socio-economic Caste Census 2011
 Biometrics Capturing for Nation Population Register
 Encryptors for the Ministry of Home Affairs
 IFF (Identify Friend or Foe) secondary radar
 SDR and IP radio in multiple frequency bands

Some products are manufactured by Bharat Electronics Ltd. with help of ToT (Transfer of Technology).

Locations
Bharat Electronics Limited has its units in the following cities of India.
 Bangalore (corporate head office and factory), Karnataka
 Chennai, Tamil Nadu
 Panchkula (Haryana)
 Kotdwar, (Uttarakhand)
 Ghaziabad, (Uttar Pradesh)
 Pune, Maharashtra
 Hyderabad, Telangana
 Navi Mumbai
 Machilipatnam, Andhra Pradesh

Foreign offices
 New York City
 Singapore
 Hanoi, Vietnam
 Yangon, Myanmar

Regional offices
 New Delhi
 Mumbai
 Calcutta
 Vizag

Subsidiary 
BEL Optronic Devices Ltd
BEL Optronic Devices Ltd. is a subsidiary company of BEL. It was founded in 1990 with the aim of conducting research, development and manufacture of image intensifier tubes and associated high voltage power supply units for use in military, security and commercial systems. The company is headquartered in Pune and earned aggregated revenue of  during the fiscal year 2007.

Joint ventures
BEL Thales Limited

BEL-Thales Systems Limited is a joint venture company (JVC) between Bharat Electronics Limited and Thales. Incorporated on 28 August 2014, the company is located in the BEL Industrial Estate, Jalahalli, Bengaluru.

GE-BE Pvt Limited

GE-BE Pvt Limited was set up in 1997 as a joint venture between Bharat Electronics Limited and General Electric Medical System. The facility based at Whitefield, Bangalore, manufactures X-ray tubes for RAD & F and CT systems, as well as components such as high voltage tanks and detector modules for CT systems. The products are exported worldwide and meet the safety and regulatory standards specified by FDA, CE, MHW, AERB and the facility has been accredited with ISO-9001; ISO-13485 and ISO-14001 certifications. GE-BEL also markets the conventional X-ray tubes made at the Pune unit of BEL. The turnover of GE-BEL during 2004–2005 was over ₹4.50 billion (US$97 million) including an export of over ₹4.30 billion (US$92 million). The company has been recognised for its outstanding export performance since 1998 by the Export Promotion Councils.

Ownership
As of September 2018, Bharat Electronics Limited is primarily owned by the central government (66%), Mutual funds and UTI (14%), Foreign institutional investors (6%), individual investors (5%) and insurance companies (4%).

Recent development 
Bharat Electronics Limited has set up a joint venture with General Electric (GE) USA, for manufacturing high voltage tanks and detector modules for computed tomography (CT) scan systems and advanced level of X-ray tubes. The company is in the process of joining with Bharat Heavy Electricals Limited (BHEL) to set up a joint venture to make solar photovoltaic components. BEL has signed a memorandum of understanding with Indus Teqsite, Chennai, for the design and development of digital subsystems for its equipment, test systems for its radars, avionics and electronic warfare, and another with the French company Thales International to set up a joint venture for civilian and defence radar. BEL has signed a memorandum of understanding with Textron Systems to provide nicro-observer unattended ground sensor (UGS) systems to the Indian security agencies.

Customer Co-ordination Cell
Recently BEL has set up a Customer Co-ordination Cell. The customers of BEL comprise members of the Army, Navy, Air Force, paramilitary, Coast Guard (India, Seychelles, Maldives, Sri Lanka), Police, Doordarshan, All India Radio, Department of Telecommunications and consumers of professional electronic components are allowed to register their complaints with the Customer Co-ordination Cell by phone, fax or the Internet.

References

External links
 

Defence companies of India
Electronics companies of India
Aircraft engine manufacturers of India
Gas turbine manufacturers
Manufacturing companies based in Bangalore
Government-owned companies of India
Electronics companies established in 1954
Technology companies established in 1954
Indian companies established in 1954
Companies listed on the National Stock Exchange of India
Companies listed on the Bombay Stock Exchange